The following lists events that happened during 1923 in Chile.

Incumbents
President of Chile: Arturo Alessandri

Events

February
1 February – The Lautaro de Buin football club is established.

Births 
11 February – Clodomiro Almeyda (d. 1997)
8 March – Atilio Cremaschi (d. 2007)
11 April – Jorge Hübner (d. 2006)
23 June – Julio Martínez (journalist) (d. 2008)
13 August – Osvaldo Sáez (d. 1959)
2 October – Eugenio Cruz Vargas (d. 2014)
31 October – Arturo Alessandri Besa (d. 2022)
25 December – Luis Álamos (d. 1983)

Deaths 
23 June – Estanislao del Canto (b. 1840)

References 

 
Years of the 20th century in Chile
Chile